

Results by constituency 

Inner Manipur (Lok Sabha constituency): Dr. Thokchom Meinya (Indian National Congress) 
Outer Manipur (Lok Sabha constituency): Mani Charenamei (People's Democratic Alliance)

References

Manipur
Indian general elections in Manipur
2000s in Manipur